Evonne Goolagong defeated Helen Gourlay in the final, 6–3, 6–0 to win the December edition of the women's singles tennis tournament at the 1977 Australian Open. It was her sixth major singles title. As of 2022, this was the last women's singles final to be contested by two Australians.

Kerry Reid was the defending champion, but was defeated in the semifinals by Goolagong.

Both finalists were entered in the championships as Mrs. R. Cawley, as they were married to Roger Cawley and Richard Cawley (who were not related) respectively (at the time, married female players were required to be identified using their husband's name). The umpire became confused during the early stages of the final and simply referred to the players as Evonne or Helen to avoid confusion. 

The second of the two Australian Opens held in 1977 started on 19 December and ended on 31 December. For the first Australian Open held in 1977, see: 1977 Australian Open (January).

Seeds
The seeded players are listed below. Evonne Goolagong is the champion; others show the round in which they were eliminated.

  Evonne Goolagong (champion)
  Sue Barker (semifinal)
  Kerry Reid (semifinal)
  Mona Guerrant (Quarterfinal)
  Helen Gourlay (final)
  Helena Anliot (first round)
  Kathleen Harter (Quarterfinal)
  Rayni Fox (Quarterfinal)

Qualifying

Draw

Finals

Top half

Bottom half

See also
 1977 Australian Open (December)

References

External links
 1977 Australian Open (December) – Women's draws and results at the International Tennis Federation

1977 Australian Open (December)
Australian Open (tennis) by year – Women's singles
1977 in Australian women's sport
1978 WTA Tour